Kaliszer Woch (pol. Week Kaliski) -  was a Jewish weekly social, political and economic magazine in the years 1930 - 1939 in Kalisz. The weekly published the news by some foreign correspondents like the other weekly Yiddish magazine Kaliszer Lebn.

References

1930 establishments in Poland
1939 disestablishments in Poland
Defunct magazines published in Poland
Jewish magazines
Kalisz
Magazines established in 1930
Magazines disestablished in 1939
Political magazines published in Poland
Weekly magazines published in Poland
Yiddish-language mass media in Poland
News magazines published in Poland